Christina Epps (born June 20, 1991) is an American track and field athlete who specializes in the triple jump. She competed at the 2015 World Championships in Beijing without qualifying for the final. Her personal bests in the event are 14.09 metres outdoors (+1.1 m/s, Eugene 2015) and 13.16 metres indoors (New York 2014).

Epps grew up in Morristown, New Jersey and graduated from Morristown High School in 2009.

Keturah Orji joined Team USA teammate Andrea Geubelle as the only two with 2016 Olympic Standard at 2016 United States Olympic Trials (track and field) and will represent the United States at Athletics at the 2016 Summer Olympics and in the fifth round the pair were joined by Christina Epps who jumped the 2016 Olympic Standard to form a trio for Rio.

Competition record

References

External links
 

1991 births
Living people
Sportspeople from the Bronx
American female triple jumpers
Pan American Games track and field athletes for the United States
People from Morristown, New Jersey
Athletes (track and field) at the 2015 Pan American Games
World Athletics Championships athletes for the United States
Athletes (track and field) at the 2016 Summer Olympics
Olympic track and field athletes of the United States
Morristown High School (Morristown, New Jersey) alumni
USA Outdoor Track and Field Championships winners
USA Indoor Track and Field Championships winners
Track and field athletes from New York City
21st-century American women